Jaime Reis Simões Seidi (born 22 June 1989) is a Portuguese professional footballer of Bissau-Guinean descent who plays for Angrense as a midfielder.

Club career
Seidi kicked off his career with Lusitano in 2008. He then went on to play with Atlético before signing for Oriental in 2014. He made his professional debut against Vitória Guimarães B.

References
 

1989 births
People from Angra do Heroísmo
Portuguese people of Bissau-Guinean descent
Living people
Association football midfielders
Portuguese footballers
Lusitano G.C. players
Atlético S.C. players
Segunda Divisão players
Clube Oriental de Lisboa players
Liga Portugal 2 players
C.D. Pinhalnovense players